Nancy Lee Robertson is a Canadian actress, best known for her roles as Wanda Dollard in the television series Corner Gas and Millie Upton in the series Hiccups, both of which were created by and starring her husband, Brent Butt.

Early life
Robertson was born and raised in Vancouver, British Columbia.  She studied drama during high school and graduated in 1990. She went on to attend the Breck Academy and The Vancouver Arts Club Theatre Program.

Career
Robertson's television career began with the CBC sketch comedy series The 11th Hour. She later played temperamental parking attendant Harriet Sharpe in the mockumentary film The Delicate Art of Parking; her fellow parking attendant, Grant Parker, is played by Fred Ewanuick, who later co-starred with Robertson in Corner Gas.

From 2004 to 2009, Robertson played Wanda Dollard, an intelligent and sarcastic gas station attendant, on the hit Canadian television series Corner Gas. In 2010, Robertson's husband and Corner Gas co-star, Brent Butt created a new television series, Hiccups. The show's lead role, a children's author with anger-management issues, was not initially written with Robertson in mind, but she decided to take on the role upon reading the script.  The second and final season of Hiccups ended on 28 August 2011. Robertson played the role of Principal Moreno in the television movie Radio Rebel.

Robertson is an alumna of the Vancouver TheatreSports League improvisational comedy troupe.

Personal life
On 19 November 2005, Robertson married her Corner Gas and Hiccups co-star Brent Butt. They live in Vancouver.

Filmography

References

External links
 
 

Actresses from Vancouver
Canadian television actresses
Canadian voice actresses
Living people
Year of birth missing (living people)